Laki-Laki Tak Bernama (Indonesian for Man Without a Name) is a 1969 Indonesian film directed by Achmad Salim.

Plot
Laki-Laki Tak Bernama shows a number of scenes related to sexuality, including a cheating wife and husband.

Production
Laki-Laki Tak Bernama was written and directed by Wim Umboh (also known as Achmad Salim) for Annie Mambo's Aries Film. The film was shot by Lukman Hakim Nain in CinemaScope and Eastmancolor. Idris Sardi provided the music, while Umboh handled editing. According to Tempo, the film was rumored to have been shot without a screenplay.

Supporting roles were held by Farida Arriany, Farouk Afero, Hamid Gruno, Paula Rumokoy, Sandy Suwardi Hassan, Sofia WD, Tien Samatha, Jeffry Sani, Boes Boestami, A. Hamid Arief, and Dicky Zulkarnaen. This was Melati's first film role after a five year hiatus, as well as the last role of Boestami, who died two years later.

Release and reception
Laki-Laki Tak Bernama was released in 1969. It was advertised as the first Indonesian sex film, as well as "the only National film that is the bravest and biggest . . . . with SEX scenes which are explicit without pulling any punches". The poster featured images of kissing and a woman undressing, and urged viewers to take their girlfriends to see the film.

J.B. Kristanto, in his catalogue of Indonesian films, writes that, though Laki-Laki Tak Bernama builds its characters sufficiently, the film's plot is convoluted and unclear.

References

Works cited

 

 

Films directed by Wim Umboh